Prime Time is an album by American singer-songwriter Don McLean, released in December 1977. Drake sampled "The Wrong Thing to Do" in his song "Doing It Wrong" from 2011's Take Care.

Record World called the title track "a rock 'n roll song with a honky-tonk flavor and a good deal of strong and ironic social commentary."

Track listing
All tracks composed by Don McLean, except where indicated.

"Prime Time"
"The Statue"
"Jump"
"Red Wing"
"The Wrong Thing to Do"
"The Pattern Is Broken"
"When Love Begins"
"Color TV Blues"
"Building My Body"
"Down the Road/Sally Ann"
"When a Good Thing Goes Bad"
"South of the Border" (Michael Carr, Jimmy Kennedy)
"If You Can Dream"

Personnel
Don McLean - guitar, banjo, vocals, electric bass on "When Love Begins"
Rob Stoner - electric bass, backing vocals
Howie Wyeth - drums, marimba, piano, harpsichord, backing vocals
with:
David Sanborn - saxophone on "Jump"
Dom Cortese - accordion on "South of the Border"
Kenny Asher - organ, electric piano, clavinet, synthesizer, string arrangements
Rubens Bassini - percussion
Christine Faith, Angela Howell, Rona Wyeth - backing vocals on "Jump"
John Farrell - electric guitar on "Prime Time"
Ed Freeman - piano on "Building My Body"
Gene Orloff and His Strings - strings, concertmaster
Pat Rebillot - piano

References 

Don McLean albums
1977 albums
Arista Records albums